The 1992 Regal Scottish Masters was a professional non-ranking snooker tournament that took place between 23 and 27 September 1992 at the Motherwell Civic Centre in Motherwell, Scotland.

Neal Foulds won the tournament by defeating Gary Wilkinson 10–8 in the final.

Prize fund
The breakdown of prize money for this year is shown below: 
Winner: £40,000
Runner-up: £20,000
Semi-final: £11,000
Quarter-final: £6,250
Round 1: £3,500
Highest break: £3,000
Total: £121,000

Main draw

Century breaks

 137  James Wattana
 136  Neal Foulds
 114  Alan McManus
 106  Gary Wilkinson

References

1992
Masters
Scottish Masters
Scottish Masters